"I Thank God" is a song performed by American contemporary worship groups Maverick City Music and Upperroom featuring Dante Bowe, Maryanne J. George, Aaron Moses and Chuck Butler. It was released by Tribl Records as a track on their collaborative extended play, Move Your Heart, on January 29, 2021. The song was written by Bryan Torwalt, Katie Torwalt, and Naomi Raine. Jonathan Jay, Tony Brown, and Oscar Gamboa produced the song.

"I Thank God" debuted at No. 29 on the US Hot Christian Songs chart, and No. 7 on the Hot Gospel Songs chart.

Background
On January 22, 2021, Tribl published the official music video of "I Thank God" by Maverick City Music and Upperroom featuring Dante Bowe, Maryanne J. George, Aaron Moses, and Chuck Butler, in the lead-up to the release of Move Your Heart EP slated for January 29, 2021. The song was released as a track on the extended play on January 29, 2021.

Composition

Commercial performance
"I Thank God" debuted at No. 29 on the US Hot Christian Songs, and No. 7 on the Hot Gospel Songs charts dated February 13, 2021, "I Thank God" is the first top ten Hot Gospel Songs entry for both Maverick City Music and Upperroom.

Music video
Tribl released the official music video of "I Thank God" featuring Dante Bowe, Maryanne J. George, Aaron Moses, and Chuck Butler leading the song at Upperroom, Dallas, Texas, through their YouTube channel on January 22, 2021.

Charts

References

External links
 

2021 songs
Maverick City Music songs
Dante Bowe songs
Songs written by Dante Bowe
Songs written by Chuck Butler